The Columbine Work Station in Coronado National Forest near Safford, Arizona was built in 1935 by the Civilian Conservation Corps (CCC). The complex is a representative example of a Depression-era Forest Service administrative center. The station is on a high point of the Pinaleño Mountains in forested land. The main residence is in the Forest Service bungalow style. The barn is unique, not designed to a standard Forest Service prototype.

The station was built by a CCC unit operating from a camp about five miles away in 1934–35.

It was listed on the National Register of Historic Places in 1993 for its architecture, which is Bungalow/Craftsman style. It served historically as institutional housing. The station continues to be used for summer maintenance activities in Coronado National Forest.

References

External links
 
 
 

United States Forest Service ranger stations
Civilian Conservation Corps in Arizona
Park buildings and structures on the National Register of Historic Places in Arizona
Government buildings completed in 1935
Buildings and structures in Graham County, Arizona
Historic American Buildings Survey in Arizona
1935 establishments in Arizona
Coronado National Forest
National Register of Historic Places in Graham County, Arizona